New York, New Sound is an album by the Gerald Wilson Orchestra recorded in 2003 and released on the Mack Avenue label.

Reception

AllMusic rated the album with 3 stars; in his review, Alex Henderson noted: "Wilson's musical personality is very much in evidence -- and his personality is that of an arranger/bandleader, not a hotshot soloist. Wilson prefers to leave the soloing to other people, which is something he has long had in common with Duke Ellington". In JazzTimes Ira Gitler wrote: "Hats off to the all-star band, but especially Wilson for the intersectional sonic vibrancy and overall dynamics he gave them to work with". On All About Jazz Russell Moon noted: "There is good and bad news here. The good news is that the album is terrific. Many jazz fans will be introduced to Wilson's talent through this album, and will seek more. No doubt Gerald Wilson will be in demand because of this album. The bad news is that the New Sound of New York isn't as good as the old sound of Los Angeles to this listener's ears... So give Gerald Wilson full marks for the courage to take on some of his best work and give it a new visage". The Penguin Guide to Jazz Recordings describes it as “a record any jazz lover should be delighted to hear.”

Track listing 
All compositions by Gerald Wilson except where noted.
 "Milestones" (Miles Davis) - 7:28
 "Blues for the Count" - 9:55
 "Equinox" (John Coltrane) - 6:42
 "Viva Tirado (Mucho Mas)" - 9:14
 "Teri" - 3:37
 "Blues for Yna Yna" - 8:08
 "Theme for Monterey" - 14:51 	
 "M Capetillo" - 4:53
 "Josefina" - 5:16
 "Nancy Jo" - 6:08

Personnel 
Gerald Wilson - arranger, conductor
Clark Terry - trumpet, flugelhorn (tracks 2 & 6)
Jon Faddis (tracks 1, 2, 5, 6, 8, 9 & 10), Frank Greene (tracks 3, 4 & 7), Eddie Henderson, Sean Jones, Jimmy Owens - trumpet
Luis Bonilla, Benny Powell, Douglas Purviance, Dennis Wilson - trombone
Jerry Dodgion - alto saxophone, flute
Jesse Davis - alto saxophone
Frank Wess - tenor saxophone, flute
Jimmy Heath - tenor saxophone
Kenny Barron (tracks 1, 2, 5, 6, 8, 9 & 10), Renee Rosnes (tracks 3, 4 & 7) - piano
Oscar Castro-Neves (track 8), Anthony Wilson - guitar 
Bob Cranshaw (tracks 2, 3 & 6), Trey Henry (tracks 5, 7 & 9), Larry Ridley (tracks 1, 4, 6, 8 & 10) - bass 
Stix Hooper (tracks 2-4 & 7), Lewis Nash  (tracks: 1, 5, 6 & 8-10) - drums

References 

Gerald Wilson albums
2003 albums
Mack Avenue Records albums
Albums arranged by Gerald Wilson
Albums conducted by Gerald Wilson